In Hinduism, the yatra (pilgrimage) to the tirthas (sacred places) has special significance for earning the punya (spiritual merit) needed to attain the moksha (salvation) by performing the darśana (viewing of deity), the parikrama (circumambulation), the yajna (sacrificial fire offering), the Dhyana (spiritual contemplation), the puja (worship), the prarthana (prayer, which could be in the form of mantra - sacred chants, bhajan - prayer singing, or kirtan - collective musical prayer performance), the dakshina (alms and donation for worthy cause), the seva (selfless service towards community, devotees or temple), the  bhandara (running volunteer community kitchen for pilgrims), etc. These sacred places are usually located on the banks of sacred waters, such as sacred rivers or their tributaries (among the rigvedic rivers of sapta sindhu the trio ganges-yamuna-saraswati are considered most sacred), the kundas (pond or lake, among these the Lake Manasarovar is considered most scared), the ghats (water bodies with stairs such as Ghats in Varanasi), or the stepwells (among these the rani ki vav in the form of inverted temple is considered most spectacular), or the temple tanks.
 
In order of importance, in India there are 7 Sapta Puri holy cities, 4 Dhams (Char Dham) and 12 Jyotirlings devoted to the Lord Shiva, 51 Shakti Pithas devoted to the feminine manifestation of the god, and the important Lord Rama circuit (Ayodhya, Chitrakoot, Hampi and Rameswaram) and Lord Krishna circuit (Braj,  Kurukshetra and Dwarka).

Holy Places: Himalayan Chota Char Dham - Badrinath, Kedarnath, Gangotri, and Yamunotri.
Varanasi, Prayagraj, Haridwar-Rishikesh, Mathura-Vrindavan, Ayodhya, Dwarka and Rameswaram.

Holy Fairs: The Kumbh Mela (the "pitcher festival") is one of the holiest of Hindu pilgrimages that is held four times every twelve years; the location is rotated among the four cities of Prayagraj, Haridwar, Nashik, and Ujjain. The Mahamaham in temple town of Kumbakonam is also celebrated once in 12 years. Annual Gita Mahotsav at Kurukshetra, Shravani Mela at Deoghar, and Pitrapaksha Mela at Gaya are also notable holy fairs. 

Holy Temples: the Char Dham  of Rameswaram, Dwarka, Puri and Badrinath.
Katra, home to the Vaishno Devi temple; Puri home to Vaishnava Jagannath temple and Rath Yatra celebration; Tirumala - Tirupati, home to the Tirumala Venkateswara Temple; Sabarimala home to Swami Ayyappan; the 108 Divya Desams; the Shakti Peethas; the twelve Jyotirlingas; the seven Sapta Puri; the Pancha Bhoota Stalam.

Holy Deity :  Kuladaivat  Hindu families have their own family patron deity. This deity is common to a lineage, a clan or a locality.

Samadhis (shrines) of Saints: Alandi, Samadhi of Dnyaneshwar: Mantralayam, samadhi of Raghavendra Tirtha, Belur Math which enshrine that Holy remains of Sri Ramakrishna, Sri Sarada Devi, Swami Vivekananda Puri, and other direct Disciples of Sri Ramakrishna, Tulsi Ghat, Varanasi where Saint Tulsidas left his mortal coil, Samadhi Mandir of Saint Kabir at Gorakhpur, near Varanasi, Panchaganga Ghat, Varanasi where Trailanga Swami lived and left his mortal body, Karar Ashram, Puri where Swami Sri Yukteswar Giri, attained the Mahasamadhi.

List 

 48 kos parikrama of Kurukshetra
 Adhi Thiruvarangam
 Ahobilam
 Alagar Koyil
 Akshardham (Delhi) 
 Alandi
 Amararama
 Alampur Jogulamba Temple
 Alampur Navabrahma Temples
 Amarnath
 Anegudde
 Anaimalai
 Arasavalli
 Ashtavinayak temples 
 Attukal
 Avittathur
 Avudaiyarkoil
 Ayodhya
 Badrinath
 Baidyanath Temple
 Bangalore
Bagdana
 Barsana
 Batu Caves
 Belur Math
 Bhadrachalam
 Biraja Temple Jajpur
 Bhavani
 Bhimashankar Temple
 Chennai
 Chidambaram
 Chilkur Balaji Temple
 Chitrakuta
 Chottanikkara
 Dharmasthala
 Divya Desams
 Draksharama
 Dwarka
 Gangotri
 Gaya
 Ghatikachala
 Gokarna
 Gokul
 Golden Temple, Sripuram
 Govardhan
 Grishneshwar Jyotirlinga
 Guruvayur
 Hampi
 Haridwar
 Horanadu
 Idagunji
 Jejuri
 Jyotirmath
 Kalaram Temple
 Kalasa
 Kalavai
 Kanchipuram
 Kanipakam
 Kanyakumari
 Karmanghat Hanuman Temple
 Kateel
 Kartik Swami
 Kedarnath
 Kolhapur Mahalaxmi Temple
 Kollur
 Konark
 Koothanur
 Ksheerarama
 Kudalasangama
 Kukke Subramanya Temple
 Kumararama
 Kumbakonam
 Kurukshetra
 Laxminarayan Temple, Delhi
 Lingaraja Temple
 Mahakaleshwar Jyotirlinga
 Madurai
 Maha Devi Tirth temple in Kullu
 Mahabalipuram
 Mantralayam
 Marudhamalai
 Mathura
 Melmaruvathur
 Melmalayanur
 Minavada
 Mount Abu
 Mount Kailash
 Mukhalingam
 Mumbai
 Murdeshwar
 Mysore
 Nageshwar Temple
 Namakkal Anjaneyar Temple
 Nashik
 Navagraham Temples
 Nellitheertha
 Omkareshwar
 Paadal Petra Sthalam
 Padmavathi Temple, Tiruchanur
 Palani
 Pallikondeswara Temple, Surutapalli 
 Pancharama Kshetras
 Pancharanga Kshetrams
 Panchavati
 Panchavatee Hanuman Temple
 Pandharpur
 Papanasam
 Pazhamudircholai
 Pillayarpatti
 Pithapuram
 Prayagraj
 Punnainallur Mariamman Temple
 Puri
 Pushkar
 Puttaparthy Sri Sathya Sai
 Puttlur
 Ramatheertham
 Rameswaram
 Rishikesh
 Sabarimalai
 Samayapuram
Sanwaliaji temples
 Satyagnana Sabha, Vadalur
 Shani Shingnapur
 Shegaon
 Shirdi
 Simhachalam
 Somanath
 Somarama
 Sri Kurmam
 Srikalahasti
 Sringeri
 Srirangam
 Srisailam
 Srivilliputhur
 Swamimalai
 Suchindram
 Swamithoppe
 Tenkasi
 Thanjavur
 Thennangur
 Thiruchendur
 Thiruparankundram
 Thiruthani
 Thiruvananthapuram
 Thiruverkadu
 Thrissur
 Tirupati
 Tripura Sundari
 Thiruvanaikaval
 Tiruvannamalai
 Trichy Uchi Pillayar Temple
 Trimbakeshwar Shiva Temple
 Tuljapur Bhavani temple
 Udupi
 Ujjain
 Vaishno Devi
 Varanasi
 Raja Rajeswara Temple, Vemulawada
 Vellore
 Vijayawada
 Vindhayachal
 Vrindavan
 Yadagirigutta Temple
 Yamunotri
 Virpur, Rajkot district

See also

 The Archaeology of Hindu Ritual
 Culture of India
 Hindu pilgrimage sites of world
 Kumbh Mela
 List of Hindu festivals
 List of Parikrama pilgrim circuits
 List of Parikrama pilgrim sites
 Tourism in India
 Yatra

References

Further reading
  
  
  

 
Lists of pilgrimage sites in India
India religion-related lists
Hinduism-related lists